Serious Business Records is an independent record label founded by Travis Harrison and Andy Ross in Brooklyn, NY in 2004. Since its inception, Serious Business Records has grown to include 14 acts, spanning the genres of classic rock, punk, pop, Americana/Old-Time, and electronic music. Its 33 releases have received press attention in Time Out NY, Allmusic, the Allmusic Blog, Pitchfork Media, the Washington Post, and Spin, amongst others. Serious Business bands have played 3 CMJ showcases, the Knitting Factory, Pianos, Irving Plaza, the Highline Ballroom, the Bowery Ballroom, and innumerable small New York venues.

History

Formation
In 2002, Travis Harrison and Andy Ross began collaborating on two music projects—a rock band called Unsacred Hearts and a solo vehicle called Secret Dakota Ring. The two bands recorded their debut albums, and Harrison and Ross created Serious Business Records as a means to release these endeavors.

From late 2002 until 2003 the hitherto unnamed label operated out of a one-room shack on the side of the road in Sayville, Long Island near Travis's hometown. In April 2003 the label moved into another tiny one room shack, this time in Long Island City, Queens. In January 2004 it relocated yet again to a  loft space at 538 Johnson Ave in East Williamsburg/Bushwick, Brooklyn. It was at this location that the fledgling label officially became Serious Business Records. In late 2004, co-founder Andy Ross moved from New York to California become the guitarist for the rock band OK Go. Ross has nevertheless remained active in the operation of Serious Business Records. In January 2007 Serious Business relocated to 73 Spring Street in SoHo where it remains to this day.

Musical direction
From its beginning with the Unsacred Hearts and Secret Dakota Ring, Serious Business records soon reached out to musical acquaintances and long-time friends Man in Gray, The Two Man Gentlemen Band, and DraculaZombieUSA. These 5 bands formed the nucleus of Serious Business Records, and though they had little in common musically, many of the same musicians were members of each band. This musical cross-pollination created a close-knit, almost family oriented structure to Serious Business Records that rests at the core of its philosophy as a label. Of the five members in Rocketship Park, only one is not in Higgins; The Homosexuals' current lineup includes two members of the Unsacred Hearts, and multi-instrumentalist Josh Kaufman regularly performs with Rocketship Park, Higgins, Jack and the Pulpits, and Secret Dakota Ring. This unique ideology has served Serious Business Records well—the debut records from Secret Dakota Ring and The Two Man Gentlemen Band have long since sold out, and the label continues to attract new bands.

Expansion and future
Serious Business Records added The Octagon and Kickstart in 2006 and brought out new releases from Benji Cossa and Looker in 2007. In 2008 the label put out a total of 15 releases, amongst them new records from Rocketship Park, Jack and the Pulpits, Higgins notable UK DIY art-punk founding fathers The Homosexuals. The latter's 10-inch EP Love Guns? came out in October and was the first piece of new vinyl issued by the Homosexuals since 1984. Founder Travis Harrison admits that there is little rhyme or reason to the label's expansion. He states, "Everyone who has come on board has done so almost as a complete accident. Old friends colliding with good music."

In 2009, Serious Business will continue to issue new material from The Homosexuals. Their second SBR 10-inch vinyl EP is due in April. The fourth album from the constantly touring Vaudevillian Americana duo The Two Man Gentlemen Band is due in February 2009. It is called Drip Dryin' with the Two Man Gentlemen Band (SBR35). The Unsacred Hearts, who are the band responsible for the label's first release in 2004, will issue their second album The Honor Bar. Higgins will issue a split 7-inch with Andy From Denver. Andy Gonzales is the founder and driving force behind Marshmallow Coast, an act closely associated with Athens GA's Elephant 6 collective. Andy has collaborated with Of Montreal and Olivia Tremor Control.

Timeline

Founders

Travis Harrison
As a drummer, Travis Harrison has performed with The Homosexuals, The Unsacred Hearts, Double Dong, Secret Dakota Ring, DraculaZombieUSA, TaxiTaxi, Benji Cossa and the Two Man Gentlemen Band as well as participating in the Boredoms' 77 BoaDrum event in 2007.  
As an engineer and producer working out of his own studio in NYC, Travis has worked with Professor Murder, Jaymay, Marnie Stern, Noah and the Whale, the Rosewood Thieves, the Red Romance and countless others.

Andy Ross
After starting Serious Business, Andy joined Capitol Records power poppers OK Go in 2005, touring for nearly 3 years to support their sophomore Oh No. Andy won a Grammy in 2006 for OK Go's "treadmill video" which to date has earned 43 million YouTube views. His solo project Secret Dakota Ring released its 2nd album on Serious Business this year. He's also a computer programmer and spearheads all Serious Business' web based projects.

Press and gigs
Serious Business artists have been featured in Time Out NY, Allmusic, and the Allmusic Blog. The Homosexuals have received accolades from Pitchfork Media, the Washington Post, and Spin magazine. The Two Man Gentlemen Band has been on the covers of countless local papers as well as Paste.com and Blender magazine. Allmusic writes this about Serious Business Music:
You have to love a record label that isn’t driven by profits, hipness, or some misguided attempt to capture and define a style. New York-based label Serious Business is a label of love — love for music of all kinds.

Serious Business bands have played prolifically in and around the New York area, including 3 CMJ Showcases, the Knitting Factory, Pianos, the Highline Ballroom, and the Bowery Ballroom. The Homosexuals recently completed a nationwide tour in 2008, Looker tours the UK frequently, and the Two Man Gentlemen Band is in the midst of a continuous nationwide tour.

See also
 List of record labels

References

External links
  .

American record labels
Rock record labels